The women's club throw at the 2011 IPC Athletics World Championships was held at the QEII Stadium on 22 January

Classification F31/32/51: cerebral palsy, head injury, stroke, spinal cord injury or les autres

Medalists

Results

Final

Key:  NM = No Mark

See also
List of IPC world records in athletics

References
General
Schedule and results, Official site of the 2011 IPC Athletics World Championships
IPC Athletics Classification Explained, Scottish Disability Sport
Specific

Club throw
2011 in women's athletics
Club throw at the World Para Athletics Championships